American Finnish,  or  is a form of the Finnish language spoken in North America. It has been heavily influenced by the English language. American Finnish was used actively until the 1950s and after that it has been declining, and Finnish Americans have been switching to English. Even some basic phrases like  'that's right' were borrowed from English. The form of speech was studied by Pertti Virtaranta in 1960, and the first American Finnish dictionary was made in 1992. It has influence from English both in syntax and vocabulary. In 2013 Finnish was spoken by 26,000 people in their homes. In the town of Oulu, Wisconsin, there are documented third-generation speakers of American Finnish, and in Stanton Township, Michigan, there are children who speak the language. American Finnish also retained loanwords from Swedish, which Modern Finnish lost.

Those in the second and third generations who speak American Finnish are usually bilingual and tend to use English most often. There have been some negative attitudes to "impurities" in American Finnish, however American Finns usually consider it a language of their own and dislike linguistic purism.

Finnish Americans sometimes have problems understanding modern Finnish of Finland. There is not much areal variation in American Finnish; however, first, second and third generation speakers have more variation in their speech, especially as the amount of English influence differs in generations.

Features 
There are also grammatical differences from Finnish, such as consonant gradation. In American Finnish the letter k remains unchanged, unlike in Finnish: laki 'law', lakit 'laws' (Finnish: laki, lait). And in American Finnish the first person plural ending has often been dropped: me ei saa 'we can't' (Finnish: me emme saa). Another difference in American Finnish is that the sound  doesn't change into an  when conjugated: kieli 'language', kielit 'languages' (Finnish: kieli, kielet).

Vocabulary 
American Finnish has many loanwords from English, but also retained older Swedish loanwords that Finnish lost.

Grammar

Cases 

In American Finnish the possessive suffixes are rarely used..

Examples of American Finnish

"There are more of them, but they are moose hunting."

"to fix"

"Now I have to call to Albert fast."

See also 
 Finnish Americans
 Finnish Canadians
 Oulu, Wisconsin
 Finglish

References

External links 
 American-Finnish recordings (in Finnish)
 Amerikansuomalaisten kieli (about Fingelska, in Finnish)
 American Finnish examples at Wikisource
 American Finnish incubator plus   

Finnic languages
Finnish dialects
Languages of the United States
Languages of Canada